The 2004–05 season was the 113th season in the existence of Hertha BSC and the club's eighth consecutive season in the top flight of German football. In addition to the domestic league, Hertha BSC participated in this season's edition of the DFB-Pokal. The season covered the period from 1 July 2004 to 30 June 2005.

Transfers

In

Out

Competitions

Overall record

Bundesliga

League table

Results summary

Results by round

Matches

Source:

DFB-Pokal

Statistics

Goalscorers

References

Hertha BSC seasons
Hertha BSC